Ruby Rose Neri (born 1970) is an American artist based in Los Angeles, California. She was born and raised in California's Bay Area, drawing creative influence from her parents and their friends. Her father is Manuel Neri, a prolific sculptor associated with the Bay Area Figurative Movement, and her mother, Susan Neri, is a graphic designer. Neri is both a painter and a sculptor, and has worked with a wide array of materials including clay, plaster, bronze, steel, fiberglass, glaze, acrylic, oil, and spray paint.[8] Lately, Neri has focused her practice and is primarily making clay sculpture.[7] Her work is based in abstraction and figuration, drawing inspiration from Bay Area Figuration, German Expressionism, graffiti, and folk art. Neri uses horses as a common motif in her work, which serves as a personal symbol of her youth.

Reminisce (aka REM, pseudonyms of Ruby Rose Neri)  is a sculptor, painter, and former street artist from San Francisco and Los Angeles, California, known for her portrayal of horses.

Early life and influences 
Born to a family of artists, Neri was exposed to ways of making and expressing from a very young age. Her mother's ability to render realistic images of human figures and horses proved to have a heavy  influence in Neri's early work as a painter and a graffiti artist in the 1990s, and as subjects still remain in her work today.

The style that her father developed as a sculptor during the second generation of Bay Area Figuration also influenced Neri's work, which emerged later in her life as she made the switch from painting to sculpture. Comparing one of Neri's earlier figurative sculptures to the work that her father is best known for, a number of visual similarities are apparent and evoke the closeness of their relationship. Though their handling of materials, surface treatment, and subject are akin at first glance, a deeper look might reveal subtle yet important differences.

Undergraduate studies: San Francisco Art Institute & The Mission School 
In 1992, Ruby moved from Nicasio, California to San Francisco, CA to study painting at the San Francisco Art Institute. Ruby's father, Manuel was teaching at SFAI while Ruby was a student, making his presence and influence in her education almost unavoidable. Ruby stated in an interview that, “During undergrad at SFAI all my teachers were either my father's students or his contemporaries; I felt very limited by this but was unaware of it at the time”. Despite this limitation, her experience at SFAI proved to be one of the most influential times in her life and career.

While there, she became close friends with artists Alicia McCarthy, Barry McGee, and Margaret Kilgallen. She and her friends would later become associated with the movement known as “The Mission School”, canonized by the San Francisco Museum of Modern Art in 2010, when the institution deemed the Mission School, “...the most significant art movement to emerge out of San Francisco in the late twentieth century”. In the book “Energy That is All Around”, Curator Hesse McGraw credits this group of deeply connected artists with changing the “language” of SFAI as an institution, stating that, “They have come to reflect the highest achievement of an art school, which is to cultivate artists whose work adds new strains to contemporary art, and perhaps more importantly, who care about each other enough to add life to a community of artists”.

Members of The Mission School were working within a special combination of time and place, growing up in and around art school during the early to mid-1990s during the pre-internet age, when San Francisco still possessed its “legendary bohemian-inflected vibe”. They were gearing up to start their art careers at the “very cusp of the digital age”, and with San Francisco's proximity to Silicon Valley they would go on to, “experience a culture-shattering dot-com technology boom/bust in the mid to late ‘90s”, which brought with it a rampant case of gentrification.

Through these shared experiences, The Mission School artists cultivated an anti-establishment, anti-consumerist outlook on the world. Their collective energy, worldview and active participation in various “disobedient” subcultures lead to the shared aesthetic in their artworks, an aesthetic that is visibly connected to Neri's oeuvre.

During Neri's time at SFAI, she formed her network of friends through a common interest in graffiti, which ultimately led to her inclusion in the Mission School movement. Although writing graffiti was more of a social and sometimes political outlet than a serious artistic pursuit for Neri, the influence of her time spent painting in the street is still visible in her work today.

Graduate studies: UCLA 
In 1994, Ruby moved from the Bay Area to Los Angeles, and would go on to earn her Master's of Fine Art from the University of California, Los Angeles in 1998. There, she made the gradual transition from producing mostly painting to sculpture. Her first foray into sculpture was through plaster, which she used to create abstracted figures of humans and horses in a style reminiscent of cubist painting. This transition was perhaps sparked by the fact that she was, for the first time, free of the impositions of her father's legacy. Her frustration with the weight of painting's history encouraged this transition into sculpture to continue. As Neri states in an interview for the Los Angeles Review of Books, “Painting is so demanding in terms of its history. The whole idea of what painting is became problematic for me and I didn't have the time to address all the issues that were not interesting to me at all...”.

Current work 
Having exhibited since the mid-1990s, Neri maintains a stimulating artistic practice through a commitment to experimentation. Throughout her career, she has explored the possibilities in paint (oil, acrylic, spray), plaster, and clay - her current work is a visual culmination of those explorations. Neri deftly combines elements of figuration, abstraction, graffiti, and folk art through clay, plaster, and paint to create complex, expressive and kinetic sculptures.

Neri's most recent accomplishment is her inclusion in the book, “Vitamin C: Clay and Ceramic in Contemporary Art”, published in 2017. The book is a global survey of one hundred of today's leading clay and ceramic artists - Neri is included alongside notable artists such as Anders Ruhwald, Edmund de Waal, Theaster Gates, Ron Nagle, Grayson Perry, and Betty Woodman.

In an interview conducted for Phaidon, the publishers of “Vitamin C”, she notes the various ceramic artists she was surrounded by and exposed to throughout her childhood, including Richard Shaw, Viola Frey, Peter Voulkos, and Robert Arneson, amongst others. She also states that, “Although I was primarily a painter for many years, ceramics has been a major influence on how I approach materials and how I physically manipulate objects”. Despite and perhaps because of her lack of formal training in ceramics, Neri manipulates the material with a sense of naivety that demonstrates her belief that the history of ceramics is, like painting, “oppressive”.

Neri states in the same interview that she is currently most excited by the work of Viola Frey, citing the scale of Frey's monumental pieces and her fearlessness as a woman working amongst men as key inspirations.

References 

1970 births
Living people
American graffiti artists
Modern sculptors
People from Marin County, California
San Francisco Art Institute alumni
UCLA School of the Arts and Architecture alumni
American women painters
Mission District, San Francisco
American women sculptors
Women graffiti artists
Women muralists
American ceramists
Artists from San Francisco
Feminist artists
American artists of Mexican descent
American contemporary painters
Sculptors from California
21st-century American women artists
21st-century ceramists
American women ceramists